Metagrypa is a genus of moth in the family Cosmopterigidae. It consists of only one species, Metagrypa tetrarrhyncha, which is found in Taiwan.

References

External links
Natural History Museum Lepidoptera genus database
Image at Mobile Cultural Objects Classified in the National Cultural Heritage

Cosmopterigidae
Monotypic moth genera
Moths of Asia